The phrase is a traditional Australian English term. It is used to describe the terms of a game, sport or competition, often a game of chance. A sheep station is a large sheep farm in Australia or New Zealand, hence denoting something important, large or valuable.  

The phrase "playing for sheep stations" has both a literal and ironic usage. In the negative, it is used to encourage participants to play in a friendly and not too competitive manner. Playing sport or cards or a game of some sort, but not for prizes, one might say "take it easy, we're not playing for sheep stations". It could be used starting a game of cards or pool for example, to check whether the game would be played for money, beer, or just pride, asking "so, are we playing for sheep stations or what?"

In typical Australian fashion, it can also be used to mean the exact opposite, because a sheep station is such an expensive item that nobody would bet it on a game, the phrase "we're playing for sheep stations" can also be used to mean that the game is purely for sport, and there is no bet or prize involved.

References

Australian slang